Melacoryphus rubicollis is a species of seed bug in the family Lygaeidae, found in the southwestern United States and Mexico.

References

External links

 

Lygaeidae